RATP may refer to:

Transportation:

 RATP Iași, a transit operator responsible for public transportation in Iași, Romania
 RATP Ploiești, a transit operator responsible for public transportation in Ploiești, Romania

Computation:

 Reliable Asynchronous Transfer Protocol (RATP), defined in RFC 916